Bruno García Formoso (born 6 June 1974) is a Spanish futsal coach.

Career 
García started his managerial career with Peru. After that, he coached Vietnam and led them to their first World Cup.

In 2016, García was appointed as the head coach of the Japan national futsal team. After the 2021 FIFA Futsal World Cup, he resigned. Kenichiro Kogure took his former position since then.

References

External links 
 Bruno García aspires to keep "the Spanish label" in Japanese futsal 
 Bruno García: «I love Japan, especially its food»
 Bruno García shows the way to Japan
 FUTSAL UNIVERSE INTERVIEW with BRUNO GARCÍA FORMOSO
 Bruno García: "Now I understand the meaning of globality"

Spanish futsal coaches
1974 births
Living people